Ethel (also æthel) is an Old English word meaning "noble", today often used as a feminine given name.

Etymology and historic usage 
The word means æthel "noble".

It is frequently attested as the first element in  Anglo-Saxon names, both masculine and feminine, e.g. Æthelhard, Æthelred, Æthelwulf; Æthelburg, Æthelflæd, Æthelthryth (Audrey). It corresponds to the Adel- and Edel- in continental names, such as Adolf (Æthelwulf), Albert (Adalbert), Adelheid (Adelaide), Edeltraut and Edelgard.

Some of the feminine Anglo-Saxon names in Æthel- survived into the modern period (e.g. Etheldred Benett 1776–1845). Ethel was in origin used as a familiar form of such names, but it began to be used as  a feminine given name in its own right beginning in the  mid-19th century, gaining popularity due to characters so named in novels by W. M. Thackeray (The Newcomes – 1855) and Charlotte Mary Yonge (The Daisy Chain whose heroine Ethel's full name is Etheldred – 1856); the actress Ethel Barrymore – born 1879 – was named after The Newcomes character.

Notes & Queries published correspondence about the name Ethel in 1872 because it was in fashion.

The feminine name's popularity peaked in the 1890s. In the United States, it was the 7th most commonly given name for baby girls in the year 1894. Its use gradually declined during the 20th century, falling below rank 100 by 1940, and below rank 1000 in 1976.

Ethel was also occasionally used as a masculine given name during the 1880s to 1910s, but never with any frequency (never rising above rank 400, or 0.02% in popularity).

People 
 Ethel D. Allen (1929–1981), the first African-American woman to serve on Philadelphia City Council
 Ethel Anderson (1883–1958), Australian poet, essayist, novelist and painter
 Ethel Percy Andrus (1884–1967), educator and founder of AARP
 Ethel Armes (1876–1945), American journalist and historian
 Ethel Armitage (1873–1957), British archer and 1908 Olympic competitor
 Ethel Ayler (1934–2018), American stage and film actress
 Ethel Azama (1934–1984), American jazz and popular singer
 Ethel Barrymore (1879–1959), American stage and screen actress
 Ethel Bentham (1861–1931), English doctor, politician and suffragette
 Ethel Blondin-Andrew (born 1951), Canadian politician and parliamentarian
 Ethel Cain (born 1998), American singer-songwriter
 Ethel Catherwood (1908–1987), Canadian high jump gold medalist in the 1928 Olympics
 Ethel Clay Price (1874–1943), American nurse and socialite
 Ethel Clayton (1882–1966), American silent-film actress
 Ethel Harriet Comyns-Lewer (1861–1946), British ornithologist and periodical editor, publisher and owner
 Ethel Dovey (1882–1920), American stage actress and singer
 Ethel McGhee Davis (1899–1990), American educator, social worker, and college administrator
 Ethel Roosevelt Derby (1891–1977), younger daughter of U.S. president Theodore Roosevelt
 Ethel de Fraine (1879–1918), British botanist
 Ethel Gilbert, American expert in the risks of radiation-induced cancer
 Ethel Hillyer Harris (1859-1931), American author
 Ethel Hatch (1869–1975), British muse of Lewis Carroll
 Ethel Hays (1892–1989), American cartoonist and illustrator
 E. Ann Hoefly (1919–2003), American brigadier general
 Ethel Johnson (athlete) (1908–1964), English sprinter
 Ethel Johnson (wrestler) (1935–2018), American professional wrestler
 Ethel Kennedy (born 1928), American widow of Robert F. Kennedy
 Ethel Lang (actress) (1902–1995), Australian actress
 Ethel Lang (supercentenarian) (1900–2015), British supercentenarian and the last Victorian
 Ethel Leach (1850 or 1851–1936), British politician
 Ethel MacDonald (1909–1960), Scottish anarchist, activist and propagandist
 Ethel Merman (1908–1984), American actress and singer
 Ethel L. Payne (1911–1991), African-American journalist
 Ethel Rosenberg (1915–1953), American executed for espionage
 Ethel Schwabacher (1903–1984), American abstract expressionist painter
 Ethel Shannon (1898–1951), American silent-film actress
 Ethel Smith (organist) (1902–1996), American organist and recording artist
 Ethel Smyth (1858–1944), English composer and women's-suffrage leader
 Ethel Teare (1894–1959), American silent-film actress
 Ethel Grey Terry (1882–1931), American silent-film actress
 Ethel L. M. Thorpe (1908–2001), British-Canadian nurse
 Ethel Turner (1872–1958), Australian novelist and children's writer
 Ethel Lilian Voynich (1864–1960), English novelist and musician

Fictional characters 
 Ethel Ambrewster, a character in the sitcom The Ropers
 Ethel Beavers, a character in the sitcom Parks and Recreation
 Ethel Blackmore, a character in the webcomic Subnormality
 Ethel Hallow, a character in The Worst Witch book series by Jill Murphy
 Ethel Janowski, a character in the film Criminally Insane
 Ethel Mertz, a character in the television program I Love Lucy
 Ethel Mertz, a character from The Howard Stern Show
 Ethel Skinner, a character in the British soap opera EastEnders
 Ethel Sprocket, a character in the Canadian animated sitcom Ricky Sprocket: Showbiz Boy
 Ethel Rogers, a character in Agatha Christie’s novel And Then There Were None
 Ethel Thayer, a character in the play On Golden Pond
 Big Ethel, a character in Archie Comics
 Silvercoat Ethel, a character in Xenoblade Chronicles 3

See also 
 Ætheling
 Odal (rune)
 Odal (disambiguation)
 Eth of The Glums on Take It From Here

References 

English feminine given names
Scottish feminine given names
Old English given names